Gorican may refer to:

Goričan, Croatia
Goriçan, a village in Albania